The Laboe Naval Memorial (a.k.a. Laboe Tower, German: Marine-Ehrenmal Laboe) is a memorial located in Laboe, near Kiel, in Schleswig-Holstein, Germany. Started in 1927 and completed in 1936, the monument originally memorialized the World War I war dead of the Kaiserliche Marine, with the Kriegsmarine dead of World War II being added after 1945. In 1954 it was rededicated as a memorial for the sailors of all nationalities who were lost at sea and at the same time a memorial for peaceful sailing in open seas.

The monument consists of a  tower topped by an observation deck. A hall of remembrance and World War II-era German submarine U-995, which houses a technical museum, both sit near the foot of the monument, and the site is a popular tourist venue. U-995 is the world's only remaining Type VII U-boat.

The tower was designed by architect Gustav August Munzer, who stated that the form was not meant to represent anything specific but was to inspire positive feelings in those who look at it. It has been associated by some with the stem of a viking ship or the conning tower of a submarine.

Gallery

References

External links

 Deutscher Marinebund e.V.
 

Kiel
World War I memorials in Germany
Buildings and structures in Plön (district)
Museums in Schleswig-Holstein
Maritime museums in Germany
Military and war museums in Germany
Naval monuments and memorials